Annanhead Hill is a  summit in the Moffat Hills of Scotland.

Annanhead is one of four hills encircling the Devil's Beef Tub, the headwaters of River Annan.

The hill is crossed by Annandale Way hiking trail designated in 2009.

References

External links

The Moffat Hills at Summitpost.com

Mountains and hills of the Southern Uplands
Mountains and hills of Dumfries and Galloway
Mountains and hills of the Scottish Borders